Wiseana jocosa is a species of moth belonging to the family Hepialidae. It was described by Edward Meyrick in 1912 and is endemic to New Zealand.

The wingspan is 34–38 mm for males and 44–55 mm for females. The colour of the forewings is usually dark brown. Adults are on wing from October to January.

References

Hepialidae
Moths described in 1912
Moths of New Zealand
Endemic fauna of New Zealand
Endemic moths of New Zealand